Gilbert D. Christie (born 1892) was a Scottish professional footballer who played for Huddersfield Town and Halifax Town, but he is not featured in records after World War I.

1892 births
Year of death missing
Scottish footballers
Association football forwards
Footballers from Dundee
English Football League players
Huddersfield Town A.F.C. players
Halifax Town A.F.C. players